The 1930–31 Polska Liga Hokejowa season was the fifth season of the Polska Liga Hokejowa, the top level of ice hockey in Poland. Four teams participated in the final round, and AZS Warszawa won the championship.

First round

Group A

Group B

Qualification for final round 
 AZS Poznań - Czarni Lwów 7:0

Final round

Final
 AZS Warszawa - Legia Warszawa 1:0

External links
 Season on hockeyarchives.info

Polska Hokej Liga seasons
Polska
1930–31 in Polish ice hockey